Musas: Un Homenaje al Folclore Latinoamericano en Manos de Los Macorinos, Vol 1 (English: "Muses: An Homage to Latin American Folklore in the Hands of Los Macorinos, Volume 1"), shortened to Musas ("Muses"), is the sixth studio album by Mexican recording artist Natalia Lafourcade in collaboration with the acoustic guitar duo Los Macorinos. It was released on May 5, 2017. Musas received a Latin Grammy Award nomination for Album of the Year at the 18th Annual Latin Grammy Awards.

Background
According to Lafourcade, the recording of the album started "on a whim" during a vacation in Brazil. During an interview with Billboard, Lafourcade elaborated that her initial plan was not to record a new studio album but "just make music for myself". The album is a homage to Latin American folk music and contains original songs as well as cover versions of other artists' songs. According to Lafourcade, her goal with the album was to explore the history and culture of her Latin American roots. She emphasized that collaborating with Los Macorinos helped her capture the feelings and sounds she wanted to transmit to the audience with Musas. Describing their work ethic as fastidious, Lafourcade emphasized Los Macorinos's patience and calm attitude while accompanying her instrumentally on every song from the album.

Lafourcade explained her awareness that the majority of the younger Mexican audience that listens to her music may not be familiar with the traditional sounds and artists of the country, but felt that through the songs on Musas she was able to contribute to their better acquaintance with their past. Furthermore, the singer elaborated how discovering the songs and artists was an enriching experience for herself as well, further reinforcing her sense of identity to her heritage and history. During an interview with NPR Music she explained: "I wanted the music to sound made in Mexico. I wanted to connect to my roots." In order to fulfill her goal, Lafourcade mixed the traditional music with her contemporary style, creating a new "stronger" musical direction.

Some of the artists to which Lafourcade pays tribute to on the album include Agustín Lara, Margarita Lecuona, Roberto Cantoral and Violeta Parra, the latter being a Chilean artist associated with the song "Qué He Sacado Con Quererte" on the album. For the track "Tu Me Acostumbraste", Buena Vista Social Club lead singer Omara Portuondo serves as a collaborator. In addition to cover versions, two of the album's tracks, namely "Tú Sí Sabes Quererme" and “Rocío de Todos Los Campos” are original songs penned solely by Lafourcade.

Critical reception

Paste Beverly Brian noted how Musas was continuing the streak that the singer came forth with in her previous albums where she paid tribute to and drew inspiration from Latin musicians and classics, the majority coming from her home country. He went on to describe the album as "masterfully produced" and added that it contains "exquisite performances", further praising the overall purpose of the album as a preservation of the classics and Lafourcade's usage of them as a source of knowledge and inspiration.

Singles
"Tú Sí Sabes Quererme" was released as the album's first single on January 27, 2017.

Track listing

Charts

Weekly charts

Year-end charts

Certifications

Release history

See also
 2017 in Latin music

References

2017 albums
Natalia Lafourcade albums
Sony Music Mexico albums
Spanish-language albums
Latin Grammy Award for Best Folkloric Album